Shet District is a district of Karaganda Region in central Kazakhstan. The administrative center of the district is the selo of Aksu-Ayuly. Population:

References

Districts of Kazakhstan
Karaganda Region